Ramaal Lewis (born 18 August 1996) is a Jamaican cricketer. He was part of the West Indies' squad for the 2014 ICC Under-19 Cricket World Cup. In May 2018, he was selected to play for the Guyana national cricket team in the Professional Cricket League draft, ahead of the 2018–19 season. He made his Twenty20 debut on 12 September 2019, for the Jamaica Tallawahs, in the 2019 Caribbean Premier League. The following month, he was named in Guyana's squad for the 2019–20 Regional Super50 tournament.

In June 2020, he was selected by Guyana, in the players' draft hosted by Cricket West Indies ahead of the 2020–21 domestic season.

References

External links
 

1996 births
Living people
Jamaican cricketers
People from Westmoreland Parish
Jamaica cricketers
Jamaica Tallawahs cricketers
West Indies under-19 cricketers